Brookland School District is a public school district based in Brookland, Arkansas, United States. The Brookland School District provides early childhood, elementary and secondary education for more than 1,970 prekindergarten through grade 12 students at its five facilities within north-central Craighead County, Arkansas.

Brookland School District is accredited by the Arkansas Department of Education (ADE) and AdvancED.

In addition to Brookland it serves a part of the Jonesboro city limits.

Schools 
 Brookland High School—serving more than 450 students in grades 10 through 12.
 Brookland Junior High School—serving more than 450 students in grades 7 through 9.
 Brookland Middle School—serving more than 550 students in grades 3 through 6; receives Title I funding.
 Brookland Elementary School—serving more than 500 students in kindergarten through grade 2; receives Title I funding.
 Brookland Pre-kindergarten—serving more than 150 students.

References

Further reading
These include maps of predecessor districts:
 (Download)

External links 

 

School districts in Arkansas
Education in Craighead County, Arkansas
Jonesboro, Arkansas